Krhová is a municipality and village in Vsetín District in the Zlín Region of the Czech Republic. It has about 2,000 inhabitants.

History
The first written mention of Krhová is from 1442.

Krhová was a part of the town of Valašské Meziříčí until a vote to separate the municipality was held on 21 April 2012, in which the majority voted in favor. On 1 January 2013, Krhová officially became independent.

References

Villages in Vsetín District